Dam Başında Oturur is a Turkish folkloric tune (Kaşık Havası). Dam Başında Oturur is a form of the Turkish folkloric tune Kaşık Havası. There are similar folkloric tunes known as Bahçelerde Menekşe Uy Gelin.

References

Turkish music
Turkish songs
Year of song unknown
Songwriter unknown